Hatun Pukara (Quechua hatun big, pukara fortress, "big fortress", hispanicized spelling Jatun Pucará) is a mountain in the Andes of Peru, about  high. It is located in the Cusco Region, Calca Province, on the border of the districts of Coya and Taray, southwest of Taray. It lies south of the Willkanuta River.

References

Mountains of Peru
Mountains of Cusco Region